Agonopterix subpropinquella is a moth of the family Depressariidae. It is found in most of Europe.

The wingspan is 16–22 mm. The thorax is sometimes dark fuscous. Forewings are light ochreous to brownish -ochreous, sometimes slightly reddish -tinged, with a few blackish scales; first discal stigma black, preceded by a similar dot obliquely above it, second blackish, often obsolete; a dark fuscous often suffused spot between and above these. Hindwings pale fuscous. The larva is green; dorsal line somewhat darker; dots grey; head and plate of 2 black.

Adults are on wing from August to May.

The larvae feed on Arctium lappa, Carduus crispus, Carduus tenuiflorus, Centaurea cyanus, Centaurea jacea, Centaurea scabiosa, Cirsium acaule, Cirsium arvense, Cirsium creticum, Cirsium vulgare and Onopordum acanthium. They initially mine the leaves of their host plant. The mine has the form of a short full depth corridor. The larva soon vacates the mine and continues window feeding from a spinning at the underside of a leaf. Larvae can be found from June to July. They are dull green with faint darker length lines and a black head. The species overwinters as an adult.

References

External links
lepiforum.de

Moths described in 1849
Agonopterix
Moths of Europe